Anathallis is a genus of orchids, comprising about 97 species native to Mexico, Central America, South America and the West Indies.

Selected species
The genus includes the following species:

 Anathallis abbreviata
 Anathallis acuminata (Kunth) Pridgeon & M.W.Chase, Lindleyana 16: 247 (2001).
 Anathallis adenochila
 Anathallis adrianae
 Anathallis anderssonii (Luer) Pridgeon & M.W.Chase, Lindleyana 16: 247 (2001).
 Anathallis anfracta
 Anathallis angulosa
 Anathallis angustilabia (Schltr.) Pridgeon & M.W.Chase, Lindleyana 16: 247 (2001).
 Anathallis ariasii (Luer & Hirtz) Pridgeon & M.W.Chase, Lindleyana 16: 247 (2001).
 Anathallis aristulata (Lindl.) Luer, Monogr. Syst. Bot. Missouri Bot. Gard. 112: 118 (2007).
 Anathallis articulata
 Anathallis attenuata (Rolfe) Pridgeon & M.W.Chase, Lindleyana 16: 247 (2001).
 Anathallis barbulata
 Anathallis bertoniensis
 Anathallis bleyensis (Pabst) F.Barros, Hoehnea 30: 187 (2003).
 Anathallis bocainensis
 Anathallis brevipes
 Anathallis burzlaffiana
 Anathallis carnosifolia (C.Schweinf.) Pridgeon & M.W.Chase, Lindleyana 16: 248 (2001).
 Anathallis caudatipetala
 Anathallis carvalhoi (Luer & Toscano) Luer, Monogr. Syst. Bot. Missouri Bot. Gard. 112: 118 (2007).
 Anathallis clandestina
 Anathallis concinna (Luer & R.Vásquez) Pridgeon & M.W.Chase, Lindleyana 16: 248 (2001).
 Anathallis coripatae (Luer & R.Vásquez) Pridgeon & M.W.Chase, Lindleyana 16: 248 (2001).
 Anathallis crebrifolia (Barb.Rodr.) Luer, Monogr. Syst. Bot. Missouri Bot. Gard. 112: 118 (2007).
 Anathallis cuspidata
 Anathallis deborana
 Anathallis dimidia (Luer) Pridgeon & M.W.Chase, Lindleyana 16: 248 (2001).
 Anathallis dolichopus (Schltr.) Pridgeon & M.W.Chase, Lindleyana 16: 248 (2001).
 Anathallis dryadum (Schltr.) F.Barros, Orchid Memories: 10 (2004).
 Anathallis fastigiata
 Anathallis ferdinandiana (Barb.Rodr.) F.Barros, Hoehnea 30: 187 (2003).
 Anathallis fernandiana (Hoehne) F.Barros, Hoehnea 30: 187 (2003).
 Anathallis flammea (Barb.Rodr.) F.Barros, Hoehnea 30: 187 (2003).
 Anathallis funerea
 Anathallis gert-hatschbachii (Hoehne) Pridgeon & M.W.Chase, Lindleyana 16: 248 (2001).
 Anathallis gracilenta (Luer & R.Vásquez) Pridgeon & M.W.Chase, Lindleyana 16: 248 (2001).
 Anathallis graveolens (Pabst) F.Barros, Bradea 11: 30 (2006).
 Anathallis guarujaensis (Hoehne) F.Barros, Hoehnea 30: 187 (2003).
 Anathallis haberi
 Anathallis heterophylla Barb.Rodr., Gen. Spec. Orchid. 2: 74 (1881).
 Anathallis imberbis
 Anathallis imbricata (Barb.Rodr.) F.Barros & F.Pinheiro, Bradea 8: 329 (2002).
 Anathallis jamaicensis
 Anathallis jesupiorum (Luer & Hirtz) Pridgeon & M.W.Chase, Lindleyana 16: 249 (2001).
 Anathallis jordanensis (Hoehne) F.Barros, Hoehnea 30: 189 (2003).
 Anathallis lagarophyta (Luer) Pridgeon & M.W.Chase, Lindleyana 16: 249 (2001).
 Anathallis lichenophila (Porto & Brade) Luer, Monogr. Syst. Bot. Missouri Bot. Gard. 112: 118 (2007).
 Anathallis linearifolia (Cogn.) Pridgeon & M.W.Chase, Lindleyana 16: 249 (2001).
 Anathallis maguirei (Luer) Pridgeon & M.W.Chase, Lindleyana 16: 249 (2001).
 Anathallis malmeana (Dutra ex Pabst) Pridgeon & M.W.Chase, Lindleyana 16: 249 (2001).
 Anathallis mediocarinata (C.Schweinf.) Pridgeon & M.W.Chase, Lindleyana 16: 249 (2001).
 Anathallis meridana (Rchb.f.) Pridgeon & M.W.Chase, Lindleyana 16: 249 (2001).
 Anathallis microgemma (Schltr. ex Hoehne) Pridgeon & M.W.Chase, Lindleyana 16: 249 (2001).
 Anathallis microphyta (Barb.Rodr.) C.O.Azevedo & Van den Berg, Kew Bull. 60: 137 (2005).
 Anathallis miguelii (Schltr.) Pridgeon & M.W.Chase, Lindleyana 16: 249 (2001).
 Anathallis modesta (Barb.Rodr.) Pridgeon & M.W.Chase, Lindleyana 16: 249 (2001).
 Anathallis montipelladensis (Hoehne) F.Barros, Bradea 8: 295 (2002).
 Anathallis nectarifera Barb.Rodr., Gen. Spec. Orchid. 2: 74 (1881).
 Anathallis obovata (Lindl.) Pridgeon & M.W.Chase, Lindleyana 16: 250 (2001).
 Anathallis ourobranquensis Campacci & Menini, Bol. CAOB 60: 123 (2005 publ. 2006).
 Anathallis pabstii (Garay) Pridgeon & M.W.Chase, Lindleyana 16: 250 (2001).
 Anathallis papuligera (Schltr.) Pridgeon & M.W.Chase, Lindleyana 16: 250 (2001).
 Anathallis petersiana (Schltr.) Pridgeon & M.W.Chase, Lindleyana 16: 250 (2001).
 Anathallis piratiningana (Hoehne) F.Barros, Hoehnea 30: 190 (2003).
 Anathallis platystylis (Schltr.) Pridgeon & M.W.Chase, Lindleyana 16: 250 (2001).
 Anathallis polygonoides
 Anathallis pubipetala (Hoehne) Pridgeon & M.W.Chase, Lindleyana 16: 250 (2001).
 Anathallis pusilla (Barb.Rodr.) F.Barros, Hoehnea 30: 190 (2003).
 Anathallis puttemansii (Hoehne) F.Barros, Hoehnea 30: 190 (2003).
 Anathallis radialis (Porto & Brade) Pridgeon & M.W.Chase, Lindleyana 16: 250 (2001).
 Anathallis ramulosa (Lindl.) Pridgeon & M.W.Chase, Lindleyana 16: 250 (2001).
 Anathallis reedii (Luer) Luer, Monogr. Syst. Bot. Missouri Bot. Gard. 112: 118 (2007).
 Anathallis regalis (Luer) Pridgeon & M.W.Chase, Lindleyana 16: 250 (2001).
 Anathallis rubens (Lindl.) Pridgeon & M.W.Chase, Lindleyana 16: 250 (2001).
 Anathallis sanchezii
 Anathallis scariosa (Lex.) Pridgeon & M.W.Chase, Lindleyana 16: 250 (2001).
 Anathallis schlimii (Luer) Pridgeon & M.W.Chase, Lindleyana 16: 250 (2001).
 Anathallis sclerophylla (Lindl.) Pridgeon & M.W.Chase, Lindleyana 16: 250 (2001).
 Anathallis simpliciglossa (Loefgr.) Pridgeon & M.W.Chase, Lindleyana 16: 250 (2001).
 Anathallis smaragdina (Luer) Pridgeon & M.W.Chase, Lindleyana 16: 250 (2001).
 Anathallis soratana (Rchb.f.) Pridgeon & M.W.Chase, Lindleyana 16: 250 (2001).
 Anathallis sororcula (Schltr.) Luer, Monogr. Syst. Bot. Missouri Bot. Gard. 112: 118 (2007).
 Anathallis spannageliana (Hoehne) Pridgeon & M.W.Chase, Lindleyana 16: 250 (2001).
 Anathallis spathilabia (Schltr.) Pridgeon & M.W.Chase, Lindleyana 16: 251 (2001).
 Anathallis spathuliformis (Luer & R.Vásquez) Pridgeon & M.W.Chase, Lindleyana 16: 251 (2001).
 Anathallis stenophylla (F.Lehm. & Kraenzl.) Pridgeon & M.W.Chase, Lindleyana 16: 251 (2001).
 Anathallis subnulla (Luer & Toscano) F.Barros, Bradea 11: 31 (2006).
 Anathallis trullilabia (Pabst) F.Barros, Bradea 11: 31 (2006).
 Anathallis unduavica (Luer & R.Vásquez) Pridgeon & M.W.Chase, Lindleyana 16: 251 (2001).
 Anathallis vasquezii (Luer) Pridgeon & M.W.Chase, Lindleyana 16: 251 (2001).
 Anathallis vestita (Kraenzl.) Pridgeon & M.W.Chase, Lindleyana 16: 251 (2001).
 Anathallis vitorinoi
 Anathallis welteri
 Anathallis ypirangae (Kraenzl.) Pridgeon & M.W.Chase, Lindleyana 16: 251 (2001).

References

 
Orchids of Mexico
Orchids of Central America
Orchids of South America
Flora of the Caribbean
Pleurothallidinae genera